Santa Rosa, or Kaij Mek (O'odham) name translates as "Burnt Seeds", is a census-designated place (CDP) in Pima County, Arizona, United States. The population was 671 as of the 2020 census. This makes Santa Rosa the most populated historical traditional village on the Tohono O'odham Nation reservation.

Geography
Santa Rosa is located at  (32.325904, -112.042709).

Demographics

At the 2020 census there were 671 people, 174 households, and 133 families living in the CDP. The racial makeup of the CDP was <1% White, 99% Native American, <1% from other races, and <1% from two or more races.  1% of the population were Hispanic or Latino of any race.
Of the 174 households 33% had children under the age of 18 living with them, 28% were married couples living together, 29% had a female householder with no husband present, and 27% were non-families. 22% of households were one person and 9% were one person aged 65 or older.  The average household size was 3 and the average family size was 4.

The age distribution was 34% under the age of 18, 9% from 18 to 24, 28% from 25 to 44, 19% from 45 to 64, and 11% 65 or older.  The median age was 29 years. For every 100 females, there were 92 males.  For every 100 females age 18 and over, there were 93 males.

The median household income was $9,243 and the median family income  was $12,000. Males had a median income of $22,813 versus $23,438 for females. The per capita income for the CDP was $6,090.  About 50% of families and 51% of the population were below the poverty line, including 55% of those under age 18 and 69% of those age 65 or over.

References

Census-designated places in Pima County, Arizona
Populated places in the Sonoran Desert
Tohono O'odham Nation